Emblematodes is a genus of moths belonging to the family Tineidae.

Species
Emblematodes cyanochra Meyrick, 1914 (from Malawi)
Emblematodes aberrans  Gozmany, 1965 (from Uganda)

References

Tineidae
Tineidae genera
Taxa named by Edward Meyrick